The Great Synagogue in Piotrków Trybunalski,, was built between 1791-1793 and designed by David Friedlander. The synagogue was devastated by Nazis during World War II. After the war, the building was renovated and it now serves as a library.

Although plundered during World War II, it is the best preserved synagogue in the Łódź region and one of the best preserved in Poland.

Background
Kazimierz Stronczynski who in 1844-55 led the first official inventory of important buildings in Poland, titled A General View of the Nature of Ancient Monuments in the Kingdom of Poland, describes the Great Synagogue of Piotrków as one of Poland's architecturally notable buildings.

World War II
On the front wall there is a commemorative plaque in Polish, Hebrew, Yiddish, and English, which reads:
"This building, once 'The Great Synagogue,' and this plaque, sanctify the memory of Piotrkow Jews murdered by the Nazis during 1939 - 1945.Remembrance and restoration project in memory of the Holocaust martyrs and the departed of our Jewish community and in memory of the Great Tzadik Rabbi Dr. Hayim David Bernard."

Renovation 
In 2012 the synagogue was restored. The façade was repainted according to its original appearance before World War II.

References

Former synagogues in Poland
Buildings and structures in Piotrków Trybunalski
Holocaust locations in Poland
1791 establishments in Poland
Religious buildings and structures completed in 1793
Orthodox synagogues in Poland